Mateești is a commune located in Vâlcea County, Oltenia, Romania. It is composed of three villages: Greci, Mateești and Turcești.

References

Communes in Vâlcea County
Localities in Oltenia